VA Medical Center station is a San Diego Trolley station in San Diego, California, elevated and adjacent to the Veterans Affairs hospital next to UC San Diego. Service began on November 21, 2021 after the completion of the Blue Line Mid-Coast Trolley extension project.

Station layout 
There are two tracks, each served by a side platform.

References 

Blue Line (San Diego Trolley)
San Diego Trolley stations in San Diego
Railway stations in the United States opened in 2021